Marcelo Saragosa (born January 22, 1982) is a Brazilian former professional footballer who currently serves as the Director of Soccer Operations for Austin Bold FC in the USL Championship.

Career

Professional
Born in Campo Grande, Saragosa began his career with Brazilian team São Paulo, having signed with their youth team at the age of 13. He was sent on loan to the Los Angeles Galaxy of Major League Soccer in 2004 where he started in 24 of 26 games for the Galaxy. He then returned to São Paulo, before being signed to a permanent deal by the Galaxy in August 2005.

After starting in 10 of the first 15 games of the 2006 season for the Galaxy, Saragosa was traded to FC Dallas on July 19, 2006 in exchange for a fourth round supplemental draft pick in 2007.  2007 was a season riddled with injuries; he suffered a sprained right medial collateral ligament on April 14, 2007 which kept him out four weeks and appeared in only 13 games for FC Dallas before having surgery to repair a torn meniscus on September 25, 2007.

In 2008, Saragosa appeared in 25 games for FC Dallas and scored the second goal of his MLS career on October 18, 2008 in a 3–1 loss versus Real Salt Lake. Shortly before the last game of the regular season, Saragosa had surgery to repair a torn meniscus in his right knee on October 21, 2008. Saragosa was traded to Chivas USA in exchange for Atiba Harris on July 17, 2009. While with Chivas Saragosa appeared in 22 league matches.

After the 2010 MLS season Chivas USA declined Saragosa's contract option and Saragosa elected to participate in the 2010 MLS Re-Entry Draft. Saragosa became a free agent in Major League Soccer when he was not selected in the Re-Entry draft. In November 2010, Saragosa's blog announced he was suffering from cancer.
 
On February 16, 2012 it was announced that Saragosa had returned to Major League Soccer signing with D.C. United. Saragosa's club option declined following the 2013 season.

After taking 2014 off, Saragosa signed with North American Soccer League side Tampa Bay Rowdies on February 3, 2015.  During an April 1 season kickoff event at the Mahaffey Theater, Saragosa was named captain of the 2015 Rowdies. Saragosa was released by Tampa Bay in November 2015.

On April 18, 2019, Austin Bold FC announced that Saragosa would be moving from his role as player to be the club's Director of Soccer Operations.

Career statistics

Personal life
Saragosa's best friend is fellow Brazilian legend Kaká. They each served as best man at the other's wedding.

Honours

Club 
 LA Galaxy
 Lamar Hunt U.S. Open Cup: 2005
 Major League Soccer MLS Cup: 2005
 Major League Soccer Western Conference Championship: 2005
Lamar Hunt U.S. Open Cup: 2013 DC United

References

External links
 

1982 births
Living people
People from Campo Grande
Association football midfielders
Brazilian footballers
Brazilian expatriate footballers
São Paulo FC players
LA Galaxy players
FC Dallas players
Chivas USA players
Ravan Baku FC players
D.C. United players
Tampa Bay Rowdies players
Major League Soccer players
North American Soccer League players
Expatriate soccer players in the United States
Brazilian expatriate sportspeople in the United States
Austin Bold FC players
USL Championship executives
Sportspeople from Mato Grosso do Sul